François Louis de Lorraine (1623 – 27 June 1694) was a member of the House of Lorraine. He was Count of Harcourt. He was also the Count of Rieux, Rochefort and Montlaur. He was also Marquis of Maubec as well as the Baron of Aubenas.

Biography

François Marie was born to Charles II, Duke of Elbeuf and his wife Catherine Henriette de Bourbon, Légitimée de France, legitimised daughter of Henry IV of France and Gabrielle d'Estrées. He was the couple's third son. In his youth, he was styled as the Prince of Harcourt, later being styled as Count.

A member of the House of Guise founded by Claude, Duke of Guise, he was a Prince of Lorraine as a male line descendant of René II, Duke of Lorraine. At court, he, like his Lorraine family, held the rank of Foreign Prince, a rank which was below that of the immediate Royal Family and Princes of the Blood.

His paternal first cousins included the Chevalier de Lorraine (lover of Philippe I, Duke of Orléans), Count of Armagnac; his maternal cousins included Louis XIV of France and the above-mentioned Duke of Orléans.

He married Anne d'Ornano, comtesse de Montlaur and marquise de Maubec in her own right. The couple were married at the Palais-Royal, Paris in July 1645. Their eldest son, François, had been born before the marriage but he was recognised as legitimate in 1694. The couple had six children in all, two of which would have progeny. His eldest daughter Marie Angélique married the Portuguese Duke of Cadaval and died in childbirth. His other daughter Marie Anne was the Abbess of Montmartre from 1685 till her death. He was succeeded as Count of Harcourt by his second son, Alphonse Henri.

François Louis died in January 1694, aged 69 his wife outliving him by a year.

Issue

 François de Lorraine, Batard d'Harcourt (c.1645–c.1694) never married;
 Marie Angélique Henriette de Lorraine (c.1646–10 June 1674) married Nuno Álvares Pereira de Melo, 1st Duke of Cadaval and had issue; died in childbirth;
 Alphonse Henri Charles de Lorraine, Count of Harcourt (14 August 1648 – 19 October 1718) married Françoise de Brancas and had issue;
 César de Lorraine, Prince then Count of Montlaur (c1650–31 July 1675) never married;
 Marie Anne de Lorraine, Abbess in Montmartre (1657–2 October 1699) became abbess of Montmartre on 17 August 1685, never married;
 Charles de Lorraine, Abbe d'Harcourt (1661–23 March 1683) never married.

Ancestry

Notes

Sources
Georges Poull, La maison ducale de Lorraine, 1991

1624 births
1694 deaths
Nobility from Paris
House of Guise
House of Lorraine
Counts of Harcourt
17th-century French people
Counts of France